Pichação, sometimes misspelled as pixação, is the name given to Brazilian graffiti. It consists of tagging done in a distinctive, cryptic style, mainly on walls and vacant buildings. Many pichadores (pichação painters) compete to paint in high and inaccessible places, using such techniques as free climbing and abseiling to reach the locations. Pichação is mostly condemned both by the society and the government since it is a crime. However, there is a difference between pichação and graffiti in Brazil, with graffiti being considered a form of art (as long as the property's owner agrees to have the wall graffited), while pichação is not appreciated by the majority of the society.

History

Pichação, known also as "wall writings", began in the 1940s and 50s as political statements written in tar and "were often written in response to the slogans painted by political parties across the streets." "Piche" is the Portuguese word for pitch or tar, and pichação originally meant writing in pitch. In the 1970s, pichação almost disappeared, but it was revived in the 1980s by a group of youths who began writing their names, and the names of their crews, instead of political slogans.

Pichação has been described as a "vehicle for the youth of the city to assert their existence and self-worth, and to do it loudly.  As a social protest, Pichação is brutal, effective and pulls no punches.  There is no country on earth with a worse distribution of wealth than Brazil.  For the rich, there are nice buildings.  For the poor, there are shanty towns.  Pichação exists on the very surface of the contested wealth, and promises to keep on punishing the fortunate until they produce a world less punishing to begin with."

Brazilian pichação differs from other graffiti styles with its thin and aggressive letters. In the recent years, pichação is progressively changing its status, being more and more recognized as the art it is.

Since 2019 pichação has also appeared in Dublin, Ireland, due to the large number of Brazilians in the city.

Methods

Although its name is derived from the word for tar, many of the "pichadores" (those who do pichação) in São Paulo use a 2-3 inch foam roller, spray paint and latex paint; it is what is known in English-speaking countries by the Italian word "graffiti". In other cities, such as Rio de Janeiro, pichadores use only spray paint. Many pichadores write their crew name, while others write their own individual name. The letters are usually of equal height and spacing, although technique varies in different cities around Brazil. Although the lettering originally reflected the typography of eighties heavy metal record covers, the styles have evolved over time.

Pichadores often compete to tag the tallest, most dangerous, and most noteworthy locations.  One example of this is the group Os Diferentes, who tagged the internationally-known Christ the Redeemer statue in Rio de Janeiro. They were caught and arrested, but bragged about it the next day.

References

External links

What is pichação? From the Juxtapoz magazine special Brazil issue.
www.seidaris.de German artist analyzing Pichação and interpreting it into western form.

Graffiti and unauthorised signage
Brazilian art
Culture in São Paulo